Góry Wysokie  is a village in the administrative district of Gmina Dwikozy, within Sandomierz County, Świętokrzyskie Voivodeship, in south-central Poland.

History
Góry Wysokie was a private village within the Polish Crown, owned by Polish nobility, administratively located in the Sandomierz Voivodeship in the Lesser Poland Province of the Kingdom of Poland.

During the German occupation of Poland (World War II), in March 1940, Germans murdered 117 Poles from the region in the forest of Góry Wysokie (see Nazi crimes against the Polish nation).

References

Villages in Sandomierz County
Nazi war crimes in Poland